Quarley Hill Fort is a  biological Site of Special Scientific Interest west of Grateley in Hampshire.

Quarley hillfort is a hillfort with no public access, which is privately owned. This site  on the land surrounding the Iron Age hill fort on Quarley Hill has chalk grassland which is maintained by cattle grazing. It is rich in herbs, such as felwort, small scabious, dropwort, chalk milkwort, greater butterfly-orchid and bastard toadflax.

References

 
Sites of Special Scientific Interest in Hampshire